Thomas Michael Keneally, AO (born 7 October 1935) is an Australian novelist, playwright, essayist, and actor. He is best known for his non-fiction novel Schindler's Ark, the story of Oskar Schindler's rescue of Jews during the Holocaust, which won the Booker Prize in 1982. The book would later be adapted into Steven Spielberg's 1993 film Schindler's List, which won the Academy Award for Best Picture.

Early life 
Both Keneally's parents (Edmund Thomas Keneally and Elsie Margaret Coyle) were born to Irish fathers in the timber and dairy town of Kempsey, New South Wales, and, though born in Sydney, his early years were also spent in Kempsey. His father, Edmund Thomas Keneally, flew for the Royal Australian Air Force in World War II, then returned to work in a small business in Sydney. By 1942, the family had moved to 7 Loftus Crescent, Homebush, a suburb in the Inner West of Sydney and Keneally was enrolled at Christian Brothers St Patrick's College, Strathfield. Shortly after, his brother John was born. Keneally studied Honours English for his Leaving Certificate in 1952, under Brother James Athanasius McGlade, and won a Commonwealth scholarship.

Keneally then entered St Patrick's Seminary, Manly, to train as a Catholic priest. Although he was ordained as a deacon while at the seminary, after six years there he left in a state of depression and without being ordained to the priesthood. He worked as a Sydney schoolteacher before his success as a novelist and was a lecturer at the University of New England (1968–70).

Keneally was known as "Mick" until 1964 but began using the name Thomas when he started publishing, after advice from his publisher to use his real first name.

Career
Keneally's first story was published in The Bulletin magazine in 1962 under the pseudonym Bernard Coyle. By February 2014, he had written over 50 books, including 30 novels. He is particularly famed for his Schindler's Ark (1982) (later republished as Schindler's List), the first novel by an Australian to win the Booker Prize and is the basis of the film Schindler's List. He had already been shortlisted for the Booker three times prior to that: 1972 for The Chant of Jimmie Blacksmith, 1975 for Gossip from the Forest, and 1979 for Confederates.

Many of his novels are reworkings of historical material, although modern in their psychology and style.

Premièred at London's Royal Court Theatre, the play Our Country's Good by Timberlake Wertenbaker is based on Keneally's book The Playmaker. In it, convicts deported from Britain to the Empire's penal colony of Australia perform George Farquhar's Restoration comedy The Recruiting Officer set in the English town of Shrewsbury. Artistic Director Max Stafford-Clark wrote about his experiences of staging the plays in repertoire in his book Letters to George. 

Keneally has also acted in a handful of films. He had a small role in Fred Schepisi's The Chant of Jimmie Blacksmith (1978) (based on his own novel) and played Father Marshall in the award-winning film The Devil's Playground (1976), also by Schepisi.

Keneally was a member of the Literature Board of the Australia Council from 1985 to 1988 and President of the National Book Council from 1985 to 1989.

Keneally was a visiting professor at the University of California, Irvine (UCI) where he taught the graduate fiction workshop for one quarter in 1985. From 1991 to 1995, he was a visiting professor in the writing program at UCI.

In 2006, Peter Pierce, Professor of Australian Literature, James Cook University, wrote:

The Tom Keneally Centre opened in August 2011 at the Sydney Mechanics' School of Arts, housing Keneally's books and memorabilia. The site is used for book launches, readings and writing classes.

Keneally is an ambassador of the Asylum Seekers Centre, a not-for-profit that provides personal and practical support to people seeking asylum in Australia.

Personal life
Keneally married Judy Martin, then a nurse, in 1965, and they had two daughters, Margaret and Janet.

Keneally was the founding chairman (1991–93) of the Australian Republic Movement and published a book on the subject Our Republic in 1993. Several of his Republican essays appear on the website of the movement. He is also a keen supporter of rugby league football, in particular the Manly-Warringah Sea Eagles club of the NRL. In 2004, he gave the sixth annual Tom Brock Lecture. He made an appearance in the 2007 rugby league drama film The Final Winter.

In March 2009, the Prime Minister of Australia, Kevin Rudd, gave an autographed copy of Keneally's biography Lincoln to President Barack Obama as a state gift.

Keneally's nephew Ben is married to the former senior Australian Labor Party Senator, Kristina Keneally. She is also a former Premier of New South Wales and Sky News Australia newscaster.

Schindler's Ark 

Keneally wrote the Booker Prize-winning novel in 1982, inspired by the efforts of Poldek Pfefferberg, a Holocaust survivor. In 1980, Keneally met Pfefferberg in the latter's shop, and learning that he was a novelist, Pfefferberg showed him his extensive files on Oskar Schindler, including the original list itself. Keneally was interested, and Pfefferberg became an advisor for the book, accompanying Keneally to Poland where they visited Kraków and the sites associated with the Schindler story. Keneally dedicated Schindler's Ark to Pfefferberg: "who by zeal and persistence caused this book to be written." He said in an interview in 2007 that what attracted him to Oskar Schindler was that "it was the fact that you couldn't say where opportunism ended and altruism began. And I like the subversive fact that the spirit breatheth where it will. That is, that good will emerge from the most unlikely places". The book was later made into the movie Schindler's List (1993) directed by Steven Spielberg, earning his first Best Director Oscar. Keneally's meeting with Pfefferberg and their research tours are detailed in Searching for Schindler: A Memoir (2007).

Some of the Pfefferberg documents that inspired Keneally are now housed in the State Library of New South Wales in Sydney. In 1996 the State Library purchased this material from a private collector.

Honours
In 1983, he was made an Officer of the Order of Australia (AO). He is an Australian Living Treasure. Keneally has stated that he was once offered the title of Commander of the Order of the British Empire, and that he refused it. "I said I pitied any empire of which I was a commander". 

Keneally has been awarded honorary doctorates including one from the National University of Ireland.

Bibliography

Novels 
 
 The Fear (1965), rewritten in (1989) as By the Line
 Bring Larks and Heroes (1967), winner of the Miles Franklin Award, set in an unidentified British penal colony
 Three Cheers for the Paraclete (1968), winner of the Miles Franklin Award, comic novel of a doubting priest
 The Survivor (1969), a survivor looks back on a disastrous Antarctic expedition
 A Dutiful Daughter (1971), Keneally's personal favourite
 The Chant of Jimmie Blacksmith (1972), also filmed. Written through the eyes of an exploited Aboriginal man who explodes in rage. Based on an actual incident. Keneally has said he would not now presume to write in the voice of an Aboriginal person, but would have written the story as seen by a white character.
 Blood Red, Sister Rose (1974), a novel based loosely on the life of Joan of Arc
 Moses the Lawgiver (1975)
 Gossip from the Forest (1975), tells of the negotiation of the armistice that ended World War I
 Season in Purgatory (1976), love among Tito's partisans in World War II
 Ned Kelly and the City of the Bees (1978), a book for children
 A Victim of the Aurora (1978), a detective story set on an Antarctic expedition
 Passenger (1979)
 Confederates (1979), based on Stonewall Jackson's army
 The Cut-Rate Kingdom (1980), Australia at war in 1942
 Schindler's Ark (1982), winner of the Booker Prize, later released and filmed as Schindler's List
 A Family Madness (1985)
 The Playmaker (1987), prisoners perform a play in Australia in the 18th Century
 Act of Grace (1985), (under the pseudonym William Coyle) Published as Firestorm in the US
 By the Line (1989), working-class families face World War II in Sydney
 Towards Asmara (1989), the conflict in Eritrea
 Flying Hero Class (1991), Palestinians hijack an aeroplane carrying an Aboriginal folk dance troupe
 Chief of Staff (1991), (under the pseudonym William Coyle)
 Woman of the Inner Sea (1992), Keneally retells a story once told him by a young woman that haunted his imagination
 Jacko: The Great Intruder (1993), madness and television
 A River Town (1995)
 Bettany's Book (2000)
 An Angel in Australia (2000), also published as Office of Innocence
 The Tyrant's Novel (2003), an Australian immigration detainee tells his story
 The Widow and Her Hero (2007), the effect of war on those left behind
 The People's Train (2009), a dissident escapes from Russia to Australia in 1911, only to return to fight in the revolution
 The Daughters of Mars (2012), two Australian sisters struggle to nurse soldiers horrifically wounded in World War I
 Shame and the Captives (2014), recounts the escape of Japanese prisoners of war in New South Wales during WWII
 Napoleon's Last Island (2015)
 Crimes of the Father (2016)
 Two Old Men Dying (2018)
 The Book of Science and Antiquities (2019)
 The Dickens Boy (2020)
 Winner of the 2022 ARA Historical Novel Prize. 
 

The Monsarrat series, co-authored with Meg Keneally
 The Soldier’s Curse (2016)
 The Unmourned (2017)
 The Power Game (2018)
 The Ink Stain (2019)

Non-fiction 
 Outback (1983)
 Australia: Beyond the Dreamtime (1987)
 The Place Where Souls are Born: A Journey to the Southwest (1992)
 Now and in Time to Be: Ireland and the Irish (1992)
 Memoirs from a Young Republic (1993)
 The Utility Player: The Des Hasler Story (1993) Rugby league footballer Des Hasler
 Our Republic (1995)
 Homebush Boy: A Memoir (1995), autobiography
 The Great Shame (1998)
 
 American Scoundrel: The Life of the Notorious Civil War General Dan Sickles (2002), biography of Daniel Sickles
 Lincoln (2003), biography of Abraham Lincoln
 The Commonwealth of Thieves: The Story of the Founding of Australia (2005)
 Searching for Schindler: A Memoir (2007)
 Australians: Origins to Eureka (2009)
 Three Famines: Starvation and Politics (2011)
 Australians: Eureka to the Diggers (2011)
 Australians: Flappers to Vietnam (2014)
 Australians: A Short History (2016)
 A Bloody Good Rant: My Passions, Memories and Demons (2022)

Plays 
 Halloran's Little Boat (1968)
 Childermas (1968)
 An Awful Rose (1972)
 Bullie's House (1981)
 Either Or (2007)

Screenplays 
 The Survivor (1972)
 Silver City (1984)
 The Fremantle Conspiracy (1988)

Notes

References 
 Australian Biography website, including video interviews (and transcripts)

Further reading

External links 

 Tom Keneally at Random House Australia
 Life and Works of Thomas Keneally
 Tom Keneally Centre
 
 Australian Republic Movement web site. Search for "Keneally".
 Ross Sea Reprise Thomas Keneally recalls his voyages to Antarctica
 1983, 1989, 1991, 1993 RealAudio interviews with Thomas Keneally at Wired for Books.org by Don Swaim
 Radio interview with Michael Silverblatt

1935 births
20th-century Australian dramatists and playwrights
20th-century Australian educators
20th-century Australian historians
20th-century Australian male writers
20th-century Australian non-fiction writers
20th-century Australian novelists
20th-century Australian screenwriters
20th-century Australian short story writers
20th-century biographers
20th-century essayists
20th-century memoirists
21st-century Australian dramatists and playwrights
21st-century Australian educators
21st-century Australian historians
21st-century Australian male writers
21st-century Australian non-fiction writers
21st-century Australian novelists
21st-century Australian screenwriters
21st-century Australian short story writers
21st-century biographers
21st-century essayists
21st-century memoirists
Australian autobiographers
Australian biographers
Australian children's writers
Australian essayists
Australian fantasy writers
Australian historical novelists
Australian human rights activists
Australian indigenous rights activists
Australian male dramatists and playwrights
Australian male film actors
Australian male non-fiction writers
Australian male novelists
Australian male screenwriters
Australian memoirists
Australian mystery writers
Australian people of Irish descent
Australian republicans
Australian Roman Catholics
Australian schoolteachers
Australian social commentators
Australian thriller writers
Australian travel writers
Booker Prize winners
Fellows of the Royal Society of Literature
Granta people
Literacy and society theorists
Living people
Logie Award winners
Miles Franklin Award winners
Officers of the Order of Australia
People educated at St Patrick's College, Strathfield
People from Manly, New South Wales
Australian psychological fiction writers
Roman Catholic writers
Surrealist writers
Academic staff of the University of Queensland
Academic staff of the University of Sydney
Writers about activism and social change
Writers from Sydney
Writers of historical fiction set in antiquity
Writers of historical fiction set in the early modern period
Writers of historical fiction set in the Middle Ages
Writers of historical fiction set in the modern age